William Joseph Cary (March 22, 1865 – January 2, 1934) was a U.S. Representative from Wisconsin.

Background 
Born in Milwaukee, Wisconsin, Cary was educated in the public schools and St. John's Cathedral High School. 
He was left an orphan at the age of eleven; he dropped out of school and became a "cash boy" at Chapman's department store.
He studied telegraphy and was employed as a telegraph operator 1883-1895. He engaged in the brokerage business 1895-1905.

Elected office 
Cary was elected a member of the board of aldermen of Milwaukee in 1900 and was reelected in 1902 for the term ending in 1904. He served as sheriff of Milwaukee County from 1904 to 1906.

Cary was elected as a Republican to the Sixtieth Congress and to the five succeeding Congresses (March 4, 1907 – March 3, 1919). He was elected as the representative of Wisconsin's 4th congressional district. On Apr 5, 1917, he was one of 50 representatives who voted against declaring war on Germany.

He was an unsuccessful candidate for renomination in 1918 to the Sixty-sixth Congress, losing the Republican nomination to John C. Kleczka. He served as county clerk of Milwaukee County from 1921 to 1933.

Death and interment 
He died in Milwaukee, Wisconsin, January 2, 1934 and is interred at Calvary Cemetery.

Sources

1865 births
1934 deaths
Politicians from Milwaukee
Businesspeople from Milwaukee
Wisconsin sheriffs
Milwaukee Common Council members
Republican Party members of the United States House of Representatives from Wisconsin